Kenneth Stewart (28 June 1925 – 2 September 1996), was a British politician who served as a Member of the European Parliament (MEP) from 1984 to 1996.

Stewart worked as a carpenter and joiner, and also spent time as a sergeant in the Parachute Regiment, and in the Merchant Navy.  He joined the Labour Party, and served on Liverpool City Council from 1964, chairing its housing committee.

At the 1984 European Parliament election, Stewart was elected in Merseyside West, serving until his death in 1996.

References

1925 births
1996 deaths
British Merchant Navy personnel
British Parachute Regiment soldiers
Councillors in Liverpool
Labour Party (UK) councillors
Labour Party (UK) MEPs
MEPs for England 1984–1989
MEPs for England 1989–1994
MEPs for England 1994–1999
20th-century British Army personnel